Where the Trains Go is a 1949 German drama film directed by Boleslaw Barlog and starring Heidemarie Hatheyer, Carl Raddatz and Gunnar Möller.

The film's sets were designed by the art director Carl Ludwig Kirmse. It was shot on location in Freiburg in the French Zone of Occupation. It is part of the tradition of rubble films made in Germany following the Second World War, similar in style to Italian neorealism.

Cast
 Heidemarie Hatheyer as Fanny Förster
 Carl Raddatz as Max Engler
 Gunnar Möller as Gustav Dussmann
 Ursula Wedekind as Hannele
 Hannelore Rucker as Martha
 Oskar Höcker as Bahnpolizist
 Adelheid Seeck

References

Bibliography
 Davidson, John & Hake, Sabine. Framing the Fifties: Cinema in a Divided Germany. Berghahn Books, 2007.

External links 
 

1949 films
1949 drama films
German drama films
West German films
1940s German-language films
Films directed by Boleslaw Barlog
Rail transport films
German black-and-white films
1940s German films